Alexis Mané (born 30 April 1997) is a French professional footballer who plays as a midfielder for  club Le Puy.

Club career
Mané is a youth exponent from En Avant de Guingamp. He made his Ligue 1 debut on 12 August 2016 against Monaco. Not retained by Guingamp at the end of the 2016–17 season, Mané joined Les Herbiers VF in June 2017. Lacking game time, he moved to Vendée Fontenay Foot in January 2018.

In June 2018, Mané joined the reserve team at FC Nantes, playing in Championnat National 2. After two seasons at the club, he was one of nine players released at the premature conclusion of the 2019–20 campaign.

In May 2020, Mané joined newly promoted Championnat National side Sète.

On 8 July 2022, Mané moved to Le Puy.

Personal life
Mané was born in France and is of Senegalese descent. His sister, Marie, is a professional basketballer in France.

References

1997 births
Living people
Sportspeople from La Rochelle
French sportspeople of Senegalese descent
French footballers
Footballers from Nouvelle-Aquitaine
Association football midfielders
France youth international footballers
Ligue 1 players
Championnat National players
Championnat National 2 players
Championnat National 3 players
ES La Rochelle players
En Avant Guingamp players
Les Herbiers VF players
Vendée Fontenay Foot players
FC Nantes players
FC Sète 34 players
Le Puy Foot 43 Auvergne players